The Unlimiters are a German ska band from Berlin, formed in 2010 by members of the German ska band The Essentials (active since 2003). Their music is influenced both by the early years of ska and its later revival in the 2 Tone era. This is mixed with sounds from genres such as soul, surf and dub.

The Unlimiters released their eponymous debut album in October 2010 on the German independent label Highscore. The song Hard Times from the album was released as a single in September 2010, and appeared in the soundtrack of the 2012 German feature film Reported Missing. The album received favourable reviews in media such as the German reggae magazine Riddim and the German daily newspaper Die Tageszeitung. On 22 October 2010, the German television channel ZDF invited the Unlimiters to perform in front of a national audience in their morning show Morgenmagazin.

2011 saw the release of the two EPs In Dub and In Club, both containing remixes of songs from the first studio album. This collaboration involved dub artists such as Victor Rice as well as cumbia producers such as Erick Rincón. The remixes received airplay internationally on radio stations such as BBC 6 Music and Radio 3 of Radio Nacional de España.

Members
Current members
 Nathan Moore – lead vocals, trombone
 Erika Carmen Abalos – lead and backing vocals, percussion
 Stefan Kulaszewski – electric guitar
 Steffen Hein – keyboards
 Jeff James – bass guitar
 Mathias Wegner – drums
 Daniel Sauerborn – tenor saxophone
 Jan Kalb – alto saxophone
 Wolf Dörffel – trumpet

Additional musicians
 Geoffrey Vasseur – electric guitar

Former members
 Andreas Bergmann – bass guitar
 Claudio Jolowicz – tenor saxophone
 Mathieu Pe – trumpet
 Stefan Grosse Rüschkamp – trumpet
 Nick 'The Greek' Briggs - tenor saxophone

Discography
The Unlimiters have released one studio album, two EPs and one single.

See also
Ska

References

External links
The Unlimiters discography at Discogs

Unlimiters fb profile

Musical groups from Berlin
Musical groups established in 2010
German reggae musical groups
German ska groups
2010 establishments in Germany